Thiago de Jesus Santos, better known as Thiago Santos (Lagarto, April 14, 1992) is a Brazilian footballer.

Career statistics

(Correct )

Contract
 Atlético Paranaense.

References

External links
 
 wspsoccer
 O Gol

1992 births
Living people
Brazilian footballers
Club Athletico Paranaense players
Ipatinga Futebol Clube players
Expatriate footballers in Thailand
Expatriate footballers in Cambodia
Association football forwards
Brazilian expatriate sportspeople in Cambodia
Sportspeople from Espírito Santo